Tony Marsh may refer to:

Tony Marsh (racing driver) (1931–2009), English racing driver
Tony Marsh (rugby union) (born 1972), New Zealand-born French rugby union player
Tony Marsh (artist) (born 1954), American ceramic artist

See also
Toni Marsh (born 1968), New Zealand weather presenter